Goulandris (feminine/genitive form Γουλανδρή) is a surname. Notable people with the surname include:

Alexandros Goulandris (1927-2017), Greek ship owner
Basil Goulandris (1913-1994), Greek ship owner and arts patron
Chryss Goulandris (born 1950), Greek-Irish ship owner and horse breeder
John Goulandris (?-2016), Greek ship owner
Nicholas J. Goulandris (1891-1957), Greek ship owner
Niki Goulandris (1925-2019), Greek painter and philanthropist
Nikos Goulandris (1913-1983), Greek shipping tycoon and sports team owner

Greek-language surnames
Surnames